Varuzhan Nersesyan is an Armenian diplomat who is currently the ambassador of Armenia to the United Kingdom.
Prior to this, he has served as the ambassador to the United States from November 2018 to July 2021. He was appointed an ambassador to United Kingdom on 16 July 2021.

Education
 Global Master of Arts Program, The Fletcher School of Law and Diplomacy, Boston, MA, 2007- 2009.
 Masters in Public Administration, The Public Administration Academy of the Republic of Armenia, Yerevan, Armenia, 1996–1998.
 Master of Arts on International Relations, Diplomacy and International Law, Yerevan State University, Armenia, 1991–1996.

Certificate programs
 Vienna Diplomatic Academy, Special Course for Diplomats from NIS Countries, Vienna (1999);
 Advanced Course on the Management and Politics of European Integration, British Know How Foundation, Program of Diplomatic Studies, Brussels (1999);
 Course on Conventional Arms Control and the OSCE Vienna Document 1999, Stockholm (2004);
 International Visitor Leadership Program on Preventive Diplomacy and Conflict Resolution, US Department of State (2005), Washington DC.

Professional experience
 July 2021 - Appointed Ambassador of Armenia to United Kingdom
 November 2018 – Appointed Ambassador of Armenia to the United States of America;
 April–November 2018 - Assistant to the Prime-Minister of the Republic of Armenia;
 January 2012- April 2018 - Assistant to the President of the Republic of Armenia. Responsible for international affairs and matters related to the National Security Council;
 April 2008 - December 2012 - Deputy Chief of Mission at the Embassy of the Republic of Armenia, Washington DC;
 July 2006 - March 2008 - Head of the External Relations Department, National Assembly of the Republic of Armenia;
 April 2005-July 2006 - Head of the OSCE Division, European Department, Ministry of Foreign Affairs of the Republic of Armenia;
 February 2003-March 2005 - Head of the Conventional Arms Control Division, Arms Control and International Security Department, Ministry of Foreign Affairs of the Republic of Armenia;
 February 2000-January 2003 - Deputy Head of Mission, Permanent Mission of the Republic of Armenia to the OSCE, Vienna, Austria;
 April 1999-January 2000 - OSCE Desk Officer, Department of European Structure. Ministry of Foreign Affairs of Armenia;
 February 1998-April 1999 - Third Secretary, OSCE and UN desk Department of International Organizations Ministry of Foreign Affairs of Armenia;
 June 1997-January 1998 - Attache Department of Arms Control and International Security, Ministry of Foreign Affairs of Armenia.

Diplomatic rank
 Ambassador Extraordinary and Plenipotentiary (2018)
 Envoy Extraordinary and Minister Plenipotentiary (2014)

Academic activities
 2014-2018 - Visiting Lecturer at the Public Administration Academy of the Republic of Armenia;
 Course taught -Foreign Policy and Regional Security Issues of the Republic of Armenia Awards.
 Decorated with Medal of "Mkhitar Gosh" by the Decree of the President of the Republic of Armenia on March 1, 2016.

Personal life
Varuzhan Nersesyan was born on 31 August 1973 in Yerevan, Armenia. He is married and has three children.

See also
Armenia–United Kingdom relations
Embassy of Armenia, London
List of ambassadors of Armenia

References

External links
https://www.newsweek.com/america-must-contain-azeri-turkish-aggression-opinion-1571455
https://www.latimes.com/opinion/story/2020-10-08/armenia-azerbaijani-attacks-artsakh-nagorno-karabakh
https://nationalinterest.org/blog/buzz/how-armenia-has-navigated-coronavirus-pandemic%E2%80%94despite-azerbaijan-163602
https://www.washingtonpost.com/world/2020/10/30/armenians-azerbaijan-clashes-nagorno-karabakh/
https://news.yahoo.com/pompeo-host-armenian-azerbaijani-foreign-154430455.html
https://www.politico.com/news/2020/10/19/mike-pompeo-azerbaijan-armenia-430151
https://mirrorspectator.com/2019/10/08/28th-anniversary-celebration-of-armenian-independence-in-washington-video/
https://asbarez.com/197358/we-are-prepared-to-recognize-artsakh-schiff-tells-armenias-ambassador/
https://www.aravot-en.am/2020/09/18/264601/
https://www.wibw.com/content/news/State-of-Kansas-recognizes-their-partnership-with-Armenia-507744821.html
https://schiff.house.gov/news/press-releases/rep-schiff-statement-on-continuing-azerbaijani-attacks-on-artsakh
https://www.ft.com/content/eccacb7b-c9ad-4cba-87ac-5a8b8324eb90
https://givenews.fiu.edu/2019/01/18/on-30th-anniversary-of-armenian-earthquake-alumnus-and-donor-recognized-by-ambassador-for-service-as-disaster-responder/
https://mirrorspectator.com/2020/03/24/ambassador-nersesyan-in-washington-continues-conducting-diplomacy-despite-coronavirus-constraints/ 
https://www.defenseone.com/ideas/2021/04/american-support-needed-resolve-pow-crisis-caucasus/173224/
https://mirrorspectator.com/2021/04/06/amb-nersesyan-calls-for-azerbaijan-to-return-armenian-captives-end-destruction-of-monuments-and-negotiate-artsakh-status/

Ambassadors of Armenia to the United States
Ambassadors of Armenia to the United Kingdom
The Fletcher School at Tufts University alumni
Armenian diplomats
Diplomats from Yerevan
Living people
1973 births